Surrey Opera is a semi-professional English opera company based in Croydon, providing opera in Surrey, Sussex and Kent. The company offers opportunity to emerging professional opera singers, providing the opportunity to work with professional directors, musicians, designers and the Surrey Opera Chorus.  Alumni of Surrey Opera include known singers Peter Sidhom, Russell Smythe, Susan Gritton and David Soar. While opera forms the majority of its repertoire, the company also performs operettas, musicals and soirées.

The company premiered the rediscovered Samuel Coleridge-Taylor opera Thelma in 2012, and in 2017 staged the world premiere of The Life To Come, by Louis Mander and Stephen Fry.

Company history

Surrey Opera was founded by the late Joyce Hooper MBE in 1969. The company's first production was Mozart's The Magic Flute, performed in the Market Hall, Redhill, Surrey in June 1970. Over the years, productions of all Mozart's major operas followed, as well works by other composers.  In 1976,  conductor Jonathan Butcher took over as Artistic Director, and has been at the helm ever since.

Surrey Opera have gained a reputation for staging new or re-discovered operas such as the world premiere of Thelma by Samuel Coleridge-Taylor and Iernin by George Lloyd, not staged since its premiere in 1934. Their second world premiere production, The Life to Come was staged in September 2017. Composed by Louis Mander to libretto by Stephen Fry, it was based on E.M.Forster's short story "The Life to Come".

Their third world premiere production, Madeleine, was commissioned by Surrey Opera for its 50th anniversary in 2020 from composer David Hackbridge Johnson, based on the true story of Madeleine Smith. Its performance was delayed until 2021 because of the COVID-19 pandemic.

In 2016 Surrey Opera performed for the Prince Of Wales and the Duchess of Cornwall at Minack Theatre in Cornwall.

Past productions

Notes and references

External links
 Official website 
 Biography of Jonathan Butcher on OperaTalent.com

British opera companies
Musical groups established in 1969